The 1999–00 Eredivisie season was the 40th season of the Eredivisie, the top level of ice hockey in the Netherlands. Seven teams participated in the league, and the Nijmegen Tigers won the championship.

First round 
 
(* The Heerenveen Flyers had three points deducted)

Final round

Playoffs

External links 
 Season on hockeyarchives.info

Neth
Eredivisie (ice hockey) seasons
Ere 
Ere